WTSD may refer to:

 Waterford Township School District
 West Tallahatchie School District
 West Tennessee School for the Deaf
 Wong Tai Sin District, a district of Kowloon, Hong Kong
 Woodbridge Township School District
 WTSD (AM), a radio station (1190 AM) licensed to serve Leesburg, Virginia, United States
 WTSD-CD, a defunct low-power television station (channel 23, virtual 14) formerly licensed to serve Philadelphia, Pennsylvania, United States